Zhang Lu (born in 1977) is a Chinese diplomat who interprets for senior Chinese officials. She is known for the high quality of her interpretation as well her poise and beauty, which have made her a celebrity in China.

Zhang was born and grew up in Jinan. and graduated from the Department of International Law of the China Foreign Affairs University in 2000. She later received a master's degree in foreign affairs from the University of Westminster in London, England.
She is currently Division Chief, Department of Translation and Interpretation of the Ministry of Foreign Affairs of the People's Republic of China. With extensive experiences, she is Hu Jintao and Wen Jiabao’s chief translator, and is also one of the important chief external interpreters. People widely appreciated her quick thinking and elegant manners.

Zhang came to public attention especially for her ability to translate difficult quotations from Classical Chinese literature which she displayed when interpreting for Premier Wen Jiabao at the National People's Congress in 2010.

References

1977 births
Living people
Chinese diplomats
Interpreters
People from Jinan
China Foreign Affairs University alumni